BFN may refer to:
 Internet slang for "Bye for now"
 BfN, the Federal Office for Nature Conservation in Germany
Star Wars: Episode I: Battle for Naboo, a video game released for the Nintendo 64 and Microsoft Windows
Plants vs. Zombies: Battle for Neighborville, a 2019 video game in the Plants vs. Zombies franchise